John Brown (29 November 1909 – 15 March 1971), better known as Jackie Brown, was a flyweight boxing world champion. He held the NBA, IBU and British flyweight titles. He would be stripped of both his NBA and IBU titles while still having not been beaten at flyweight since the beginning of his reigns. The NBA stripped him on July 6, 1934 when he was arrested and sentenced to four months in prison for assault. while he was stripped of his IBU title for not giving Valentin Angelmann another chance after a draw in a title bout against him. His British flyweight title would be the only title he lost in the ring when he was defeated on September 9, 1935 to Benny Lynch thus taking all claims he laid to being a flyweight champion.

Professional career
Born John Brown in Collyhurst, England, he had his first professional fight on 18 May 1925, at the age of sixteen, defeating Harry Gainey on points over six rounds.

In October 1929, he won the vacant British flyweight title, knocking out Bert Kirby in three rounds. The BBBofC subsequently recognised Brown as the World Champion, succeeding the later Johnny Hill, and received confirmation from the New York State Athletic Commission that they were willing to allow him to defend the title in the US. In March 1930, he defended the British title against Kirby, and was knocked out in the third round. In February 1931, he met Kirby for the third time, winning back the title with fifteen-round points decision.

In May 1931, he won the European flyweight title, beating Lucian Popescu, of Romania on points. In the next two months he defended this title twice, winning on points against Emile Degand, of Belgium and Vincenzo Savo, of Italy.

In October 1931, Brown married Mary Chapman.

In September 1932, he defended both his titles against Jim Maharg, winning on a disqualification in the eighth, for a low blow.

Legal issues
In October 1933, Jackie Brown ran over and killed Margaret Thornley with his car. He did not receive any punishment whatsoever for taking her life. The very next year, Brown actually found himself in trouble with the law when he was convicted of assault by occasioning bodily harm for biting a piece out of the ear of Louis Tarchman in a Manchester street after Tarchman had called him a "cheese champion". Brown served four months of imprisonment with hard labour in August 1934.

In September 1935, he was fined £10 and had his driving licence endorsed after being caught speeding; At the trial it emerged that he had over 20 previous convictions for driving offences, some of them serious.

World titles
In October 1932, he fought Victor 'Young' Perez, of Tunisia for the World flyweight championship, beating him in thirteen rounds when Perez' corner threw in the towel. Brown was recognized as world flyweight champion by the National Boxing Association of America.

In June and September 1933, he defended his World and European titles against Valentin Angelmann, of France, winning both defences on points.

In December 1933, he defended his British, European and World titles against Chris ‘Ginger’ Foran of Liverpool, winning on points.

In June 1934, he defended his World and European titles against Angelmann, for the third time, this time, after his previous two wins drawing on points. 

In 1935, Brown was stripped of his European title for not giving Angelmann a return bout.

On 29 July 1935, Brown won two fights on the same night, stopping Jackie Quinn in the second round of twelve, and Sid Rose in the third of six.

In September 1935, he defended his British and World flyweight titles against the talented Scottish fighter, Benny Lynch. He lost his titles when the referee stopped the contest in the second round.

Later Career at Bantamweight
Following the loss of his titles, Brown continued fighting as a bantamweight. Having won the Northern Area title in October 1936, in May 1937 he fought holder Johnny King for the British bantamweight title, losing by a knockout in the thirteenth round. This was his last challenge for a national or international title, but he continued fighting until July 1939. He then retired, but made a one-fight comeback in February 1948, when he scored a points victory over Billy Stevens over eight rounds.

Professional boxing record

See also
 List of British flyweight boxing champions

References

Sources
 Maurice Golesworthy, Encyclopaedia of Boxing (Eighth Edition) (1988), Robert Hale Limited,

External links

 Biography

|-

|-

|-

|-

1909 births
1971 deaths
English male boxers
World boxing champions
World flyweight boxing champions
World Boxing Association champions
People from Collyhurst
Flyweight boxers